James Earl "Pete" Laney (born March 20, 1943) is an American former politician of the Democratic Party. He was a member of the Texas House of Representatives from 1973 to 2007. A resident of Hale Center, Texas, Laney served as House Speaker from 1993 to 2003. As of 2022, Laney is the most recent Democrat to serve as Speaker of the Texas House of Representatives.

Political life

During his tenure, Laney was widely praised for demonstrating principle, integrity, and character in his leadership of the House. He was cited by Republican Governor George W. Bush, during the 2000 presidential campaign, as a model of legislative bipartisan co-operation. As speaker, Laney "foster[ed] a bipartisan atmosphere for legislators to work together with mutual respect and place public needs ahead of personal interests and partisan politics."

Lewis triggered a speaker's race in 1991 when he announced, amid allegations of accepting an illegal gift from a law firm, that he would not seek re-election as speaker in 1993. Laney announced in November 1992 that he had secured the pledges of more than eighty of his colleagues to elect him speaker. In his first term as speaker, Laney "ran the fairest, cleanest, most open, most democratic House in memory". He was named by Texas Monthly magazine as one of the "Top Ten" legislators of the Seventy-third Texas Legislature.

Laney's tenure as speaker ended after the 2002 elections, when the GOP gained a majority in the Texas House for the first time since Reconstruction, and Tom Craddick of Midland was elected the first Republican speaker since 1871. Craddick served in the presiding post from 2003 to 2009. When Craddick undertook an unprecedented mid-decade congressional redistricting, Laney joined fellow Democrats who traveled to Ardmore, Oklahoma, to block consideration of the Republicans' bill by denying the House a quorum.
 
In December 2005, Laney announced he would not seek re-election to the House in 2006, after having served continuously since 1973. No longer speaker, Laney was still re-elected in 2004 by defeating his Republican opponent with almost 59 percent of the vote in a district otherwise carried by the second President Bush with 76 percent of the vote. Democrats kept Laney's seat in 2006 with former Crosby County Judge Joseph P. Heflin, who defeated Jim Landtroop of Plainview.

Personal life

Laney was born in Plainview to Wilber G. Laney (1918–2005) and the former Frances L. Wilson (1921–2000). He married the former Nelda Kay McQuien (1943-2016). They have three children and six grandchildren.

References

1943 births
20th-century American businesspeople
20th-century American politicians
21st-century American politicians
American members of the Churches of Christ
Businesspeople from Texas
Farmers from Texas
Living people
People from Hale County, Texas
People from Plainview, Texas
Speakers of the Texas House of Representatives
Democratic Party members of the Texas House of Representatives
Texas Tech University alumni